The Ship Ocean Industries Research and Development Center (SOIC) is a Taiwanese government owned naval architecture and maritime research institute founded in 1976.

Overview
The prime mission of SOIC is to support Taiwan’s maritime industry. To further this mission it provides marine engineering planning, ship and ocean platform design, technical services, and knowledge integration services to private and public organizations and companies. SOIC has designed vessels for shipping giants, local industry, the Republic of China Navy, and the Coast Guard Administration.

History
SOIC was founded as United Ship Design and Development Center (USDDC) on 1 July 1976. The first chairman was Chieh-Jen Chiang. The first ship designed by USDDC was a 6,100 DWT log carrier. In 2012 the institute changed its name to Ship and Ocean Industries R&D Center to better communicate the scope of its activities.

In the 21st century SOIC has been involved in projects to advance Taiwan's offshore wind power industry.

Organization
The Yacht Industry Department of SOIC is the only government supported R&D center for yacht materials and design in the world.

Vessels designed 
 Pan Shi-class fast combat support ship
 ROCS Wu Yi (AOE-530)
 SOIC designed the Tuo Chiang-class corvette in collaboration with the Taiwanese Ministry of National Defense's Naval Shipbuilding Development Center.
 SOIC, along with CSBC Corporation, Taiwan and foreign technical advisors, is involved in the development of Taiwan's Indigenous Defence Submarine.
 Hybrid electric ferry in partnership with the Finnish company Visedo OY.

See also
 Industrial Technology Research Institute
 Automotive Research & Testing Center
 Institute for Information Industry
 Taiwan Textile Research Institute

References

1976 establishments in Taiwan
Organizations based in New Taipei
Science and technology in Taiwan
Research institutes in Taiwan
Research institutes established in 1976
Yacht design firms
Boat and ship designers
Marine engineering organizations